Ramsey Creek is a stream in Pike County in the U.S. state of Missouri.  It is a tributary of the Mississippi River.

A variant spelling was "Ramsay Creek". The creek has the name of Captain Allen , who was killed by Indians in the area during the War of 1812.

See also
List of rivers of Missouri

References

Rivers of Pike County, Missouri
Rivers of Missouri